Tian Koekemoer (born 21 September 1994) is a South African professional cricketer. He made his first-class debut for Eastern Province in the 2015–16 Sunfoil 3-Day Cup on 8 October 2015. In September 2018, he was named in Eastern Province's squad for the 2018 Africa T20 Cup. He was the leading run-scorer for Eastern Province in the 2018–19 CSA 3-Day Provincial Cup, with 697 runs in ten matches. In April 2021, he was named in KwaZulu-Natal Inland's squad, ahead of the 2021–22 cricket season in South Africa.

References

External links
 

1994 births
Living people
South African cricketers
Eastern Province cricketers
Place of birth missing (living people)